The Senaki uezd was a county (uezd) of the Kutaisi Governorate of the Caucasus Viceroyalty of the Russian Empire. It bordered the Zugdidi uezd to the west, the Lechkhumi uezd to the north, the Kutaisi uezd to the east, and the Ozurgeti uezd to the south. The area of the uezd corresponded to most of the contemporary Samegrelo-Zemo Svaneti region of Georgia. The Senaki uezd was eponymously named for its administrative center, Senaki.

History 
The Senaki uezd was formed in 1846 as part of the Kutaisi Governorate on the territory of the historical region of Samegrelo during the time of the Russian Empire. In 1918, the Kutaisi Governorate including the Senaki uezd was incorporated into part of the Democratic Republic of Georgia.

Administrative divisions 
The subcounties (uchastoks) of the Senaki uezd in 1913 were as follows:

Demographics

Russian Empire Census 
The majority of the population indicated Mingrelian to be their mother tongue, with a significant Georgian speaking minority.

Kavkazskiy kalendar 

Notes

References

Bibliography 

Uezds of Kutaisi Governorate